"Lost Generation" is a song by English hip hop duo Rizzle Kicks. The song was released as a digital download in the United Kingdom on 25 August 2013 as the lead single from their second studio album, Roaring 20s (2013). The song was written by Jordan Stephens, Harley Alexander-Sule, Ant Whiting, Emily Phillips and Pete Cannon. The song peaked at #6 on the UK Singles Chart.

Critical reception
Robert Copsey of Digital Spy gave the song a positive review, stating:

"Rizzle Kicks have painted a rather bleak picture of today's yoof on their latest track. On paper it sounds like career suicide, but as always they pull it off with their razor-sharp lyrics and take-it-or-leave-it attitude [...] "Why is everybody so PC?/ It's not my fault if you take offence," they conclude - and if we're honest, we couldn't agree more." .

Music video
A music video to accompany the release of "Lost Generation" was first released onto YouTube on 24 July 2013 at a total length of four minutes and eighteen seconds. The music video was directed by Jamie Thraves and was produced with the help of 150 young people between the ages of 16 and 24, as part of the GoThinkBig initiative. The video shows Rizzle Kicks returning home from a heavy night out, before their morning starts referencing several TV shows, including Big Brother, Britain's Got Talent and The Jeremy Kyle Show.

Track listing

Charts

Weekly charts

Year-end charts

Certifications

Release history

References

2013 singles
Rizzle Kicks songs
Song recordings produced by Ant Whiting
Songs written by Ant Whiting
Jazz rap songs
2013 songs